The Harps GAA is a hurling, Gaelic football and camogie club in County Laois, Ireland. It is a combination of players from the villages of Cullohill and Durrow.

Hurling and camogie are the dominant sports in the club but, the club also fields football teams.

The club colours are yellow with red trim, and its grounds are in Durrow and Cullohill.

History
The club was formed in 1984 as an amalgamation of the old clubs of Durrow and Cullohill.

In their very first year, the club reached the Laois Senior Hurling Championship final but lost to Portlaoise in a replay. They returned to the final in 1997 and 1998 but lost both to Castletown and Portlaoise respectively. In 2016, The Harps were relegated to second tier hurling to Senior A.

Clare GAA All-Ireland winner Ollie Baker took on the club's hurling manager position in 2022.

Honours
Hurling Championship

 Laois Senior B Hurling Championship - 1996, 2001
  Laois Intermediate Premier Hurling Championship - 2020
 Laois Junior A Hurling Championship 1984, 1991, 1995, 2005, 2020
 Laois Junior B Hurling Championship -  1992, 2008, 2014
 Laois Junior C Hurling Championship - 2005, 2011, 2022
 Laois Under-20/21 A Hurling Championship - 1990, 2006,  2022
 Laois Under-21 B Hurling Championship - 1998, 2003
 Laois Minor A Hurling Championship - 1986, 1987, 1992, 2004, 2007, 2013, 2019
 Laois Minor B Hurling Championship - 2001
 Palmer Cup - 2011, 2016

Football Championship
 Laois Intermediate Football Championship - 1994
 Laois Junior A Football Championship - 1989, 2000
 Laois Junior B Football Championship - 2012
 Laois Junior C Football Championship - 2001
 Laois Under-21 B Football Championship - 1999, 2000
  Laois *Minor B Football Championship - 1995, 1996, 2005, 2016

Notable players
Club players who have represented their county or province include:
 Mick Bolger, #2 on the 1985 hurling win over Wexford that qualified Laois for a Leinster final for the first time in 34 years
 Pádraig Delaney
 Morgan Kelly, #1 on the 1985 hurling win over Wexford that qualified Laois for a Leinster final for the first time in 34 years
 Brian Shortall, Australian rules footballer

References

 
Gaelic games clubs in County Laois
Gaelic football clubs in County Laois